Neil Hague (born 7 September 1953) is an English former professional rugby league footballer who played in the 1970s and 1980s.

Background
Neil Hague was born in Leeds, West Riding of Yorkshire, England.

Playing career

Championship final appearances
Neil Hague played  in Leeds' 24–2 victory over Bradford Northern in the Championship Final during the 1978–79 season.

Challenge Cup Final appearances
Neil Hague played right-, i.e. number 3, in Leeds' 16–7 victory over Widnes in the 1976–77 Challenge Cup Final during the 1976–77 season at Wembley Stadium, London on Saturday 7 May 1977, in front of a crowd of 80,871, and played right-, i.e. number 3, in the 14–12 victory over St. Helens in the 1977–78 Challenge Cup Final during the 1977–78 season at Wembley Stadium, London on Saturday 13 May 1978, in front of a crowd of 96,000.

County Cup Final appearances
Neil Hague played right-, i.e. number 3, in Leeds' 15–11 victory over Hull Kingston Rovers in the 1975–76 Yorkshire County Cup Final during the 1975–76 season at Headingley Rugby Stadium, Leeds on Saturday 15 November 1975, played , i.e. number 2, in the 15–6 victory over Halifax in the 1976–77 Yorkshire County Cup Final during the 1976–77 season at Headingley Rugby Stadium, Leeds on Saturday 16 October 1976, played  in the 15–6 victory over Halifax in the 1979–80 Yorkshire County Cup Final during the 1979–80 season at Headingley Rugby Stadium, Leeds on Saturday 27 October 1979, and played left-, i.e. number 4, or according to Rothmans Yearbooks 1990-91 and 1991–92, in the 8–7 victory over Hull Kingston Rovers in the 1980–81 Yorkshire County Cup Final during the 1980–81 season at Fartown Ground, Huddersfield on Saturday 8 November 1980.

John Player Trophy Final appearances
Neil Hague played  in Leeds' 4–15 defeat by Wigan in the 1982–83 John Player Trophy Final during the 1982–83 season at Elland Road, Leeds on Saturday 22 January 1983.

Club career
Neil Hague joined Leeds in March 1973, and made his début for Leeds against Wakefield Trinity on Sunday 15 December 1974.

Testimonial match
Neil Hague's Testimonial match at Leeds took place in 1984.

References

External links
Photograph "Young colt Ian Slater" at rlhp.co.uk
Photograph "1978 Challenge Cup Semi-final" at rlhp.co.uk

1953 births
Living people
English rugby league players
Halifax R.L.F.C. players
Leeds Rhinos players
Rugby league centres
Rugby league five-eighths
Rugby league fullbacks
Rugby league halfbacks
Rugby league players from Leeds
Rugby league wingers
York Wasps players